Angel Dog is a 2011 family film about how a dog named Cooper, a survivor of a car accident, bonds with Jake and helps him get over a tragic loss. This film is written and directed by Robin Nations and produced and cinematography by Kevin Nations.  The two are a husband and wife team that go by The Nations.  The film’s score was composed and performed by singer-songwriter Peter Himmelman.

The film premiered in Los Angeles, California, at the 2011 International Family Film Festival on March 19, 2011.

Background
After The Nations produced and directed their second film, Leftovers, the husband and wife team, inspired by their love of dogs, set out to make a family dog film. Angel Dog marked their first push towards their mission to “bring back family movie night”.

Premise
A dog named Cooper is the only survivor of a deadly car accident where Jake lost his wife and children. Jake dislikes dogs and vents his anger on the dog for surviving. However, a bond forms between Jake and Cooper that gives him some solace.

Cast
Jon Michael Davis as Jake Bryant
Farah White as Caroline Mason
Richard Dillard as Seth
Mona Lee Fultz as Bobbie
Maurice Ripke as Trey
Ashley Hallford as Nita

Reception
Angel Dog received a 5 Dove rating from The Dove Foundation, which is the foundation’s highest honor possible.  Reviewer Edwin L. Carpenter stated, “Angel Dog is a movie which adults, along with kids, will enjoy. Don’t let the title fool you. The movie deals with something everyone can relate to: death and loss, and the subsequent grieving process. Yet “Cooper”, a stray, is a lovable dog who seems to have a mission: to help those who are lonely following a loss. Then he moves on to the next need.” Tracey Moore from Common Sense Media gave three stars from five in her review, commenting: ... "Angel Dog is a sweet, heartfelt film about loss that reinforces the value and importance of moving on, and suggests that people (and pets) may all enter our lives for a reason. It offers important positive messages about kindness, compassion, and creating the space for a person to grieve in a healthy, unrushed way. This is contrasted by showing what it's like when people don't move on, and are stuck in a lifetime of pain and unable to let go. That said, it's a heavy dose of real-world suffering .."

References

External links
 
 
 

2011 films
2011 drama films
American children's drama films
Films about dogs
Films about pets
2010s English-language films
2010s American films